The National Association of Tax Professionals (NATP) provides support, education, products, and research services to United States tax professionals. Members of the National Association of Tax Professionals (NATP) work at offices that assist over 11 million taxpayers with tax preparation and planning. The average NATP member has been in the tax business for over 20 years and holds a tax/financial designation and/or a college degree. NATP has more than 23,000 members nationwide. Members include individual tax preparers, enrolled agents, certified public accountants, accountants, attorneys, and financial planners.

Publications
The NATP publishes:
TAXPRO Weekly – Each week members receive this e-mail with information about tax alerts and news briefs.
TAXPRO Monthly – A newsletter covering current events and exploring critical new developments in federal tax laws while providing explanations of tax laws and procedures, “how to” articles, and summaries of court cases and rulings.
TAXPRO Journal – A quarterly magazine with articles on issues such as new tax acts, practical tax applications, retirement planning, and solutions to the day-to-day challenges of running a tax practice.

Research
NATP answers more than 25,000 federal tax questions a year, on a variety of issues, including:
Individuals
Corporations
Partnerships
Small and large businesses
Estates, gifts, trusts, and more
 
NATP has a full-time, onsite research staff composed of federal tax specialists including EAs, CPAs and attorneys having access to an extensive tax research library. NATP allows members to discuss the question with a tax research specialist.

Education
Live workshops: Tax professionals can choose from over 200 live nationwide workshops.
Facilitated online courses: Participants may spend about an hour a day, three days a week, participating in the online course to receive credit or pass an exam.
Self-study courses: Participants who cannot attend one of NATP's workshops and prefer not to take a facilitated online course may use the self-study method. A test is available for EAs and CTEC members to receive CPE credits.
Conferences: NATP's National Conference & Expo, and NATP's Technology and Office Productivity (TOP) Conference.
Tax Forums: This two-day event focuses on basic and intermediate level topics.

Chapters
NATP’s nationwide chapters provide support, education, and local networking opportunities for its members. Chapter activities include:

Hosting meetings where members can exchange ideas, solve problems, and discuss issues with other tax professionals in their area;
Volunteering to provide individual support and expertise about state and local tax issues to members through newsletters, meetings, and e-mail communications;
Offering local education seminars on state and local tax topics;
Interfacing with the NATP National Office to make current information available on the web, enabling members to get updates on issues in other states.

See also
Tax advisor
Certified Public Accountant
Enrolled Agent

References

External links

Professional associations based in the United States
Tax practitioner associations